From Palestine to Bengazi with the Prime Minister is a 1941 Australian documentary film produced by Ken G. Hall about the trip to the Middle East in early 1941 by Prime Minister Robert Menzies.

References

External links
From Palestine to Bengazi with the Prime Minister at Oz Movies
Complete copy of film at YouTube
12 minutes of original footage used for the film at Australian War Memorial
Extract from Menzies' 1941 diary visiting the troops 

1941 films
Australian documentary films
Australian black-and-white films
1941 documentary films